The year 1737 in architecture involved some significant events.

Buildings and structures

Buildings

 November 4 – The Teatro di San Carlo in Naples (Italy), designed by Giovanni Antonio Medrano under the direction of Charles VII of Naples, officially opens
 Palladian Bridge, Wilton House (England), designed by Roger Morris, is completed.
 Fuerte San Miguel (Uruguay).
 Samuel Eliot House in Old Saybrook, Connecticut.
 Black Swan Hotel, Devizes, England.
 The ceiling of the chapter house in Porto Cathedral is decorated.
 Approximate date – New Nostell Priory in Yorkshire, England, designed by James Paine, begun.

Publications
 Andrea Palladio – I quattro libri dell'architettura

Births
 June 7 – Jacques Gondouin, French architect and designer (died 1818)
 September 8 – Samuel Wyatt, English architect and engineer (died 1807)

Deaths
 March 8 – Domenico Rossi, Swiss-Italian architect (born 1657)
 December 21 – Alessandro Galilei, Florentine mathematician, architect and theorist (born 1691)

References

Architecture
Years in architecture
18th-century architecture